Cuba competed at the 2008 Summer Paralympics in Beijing, China. The country's delegation consisted of 32 competitors in athletics, judo, powerlifting, swimming, and table tennis. The competitors came from 13 different provinces and were mostly first-year university students.

Medalists

Sports

Athletics

Men's track

Men's field

Women's track

Women's field

Judo

Men

Women

Powerlifting

Swimming

Men

Table tennis

Men

Women

See also
Cuba at the Paralympics
Cuba at the 2008 Summer Olympics

References

 

Nations at the 2008 Summer Paralympics
2008
Paralympics
Disability in Cuba